HMCS Chaleur (hull number MCB 164) was a  that served in the Royal Canadian Navy during the Cold War. Entering service in 1957, the minesweeper was used mainly as a training ship on the West Coast of Canada. The vessel was discarded in 1998 and broken up in 1999.

Design and description
The Bay class were designed and ordered as replacements for the Second World War-era minesweepers that the Royal Canadian Navy operated at the time.

They had a complement of 38 officers and ratings.

The Bay-class minesweepers were powered by two GM 12-cylinder diesel engines driving two shafts creating . The ships were armed with one 40 mm Bofors gun and were equipped with minesweeping gear.

Operational history
Ordered as a replacement for sister ship,  which had been transferred to the French Navy in 1954, the ship's keel was laid down on 20 February 1956 by Marine Industries at their yard in Sorel, Quebec. Named for a bay located between Quebec and New Brunswick, Chaleur was launched on 11 May 1957. The ship was commissioned on 12 September 1957.

After commissioning, the minesweeper was transferred to the West Coast of Canada and joined Training Group Pacific. In 1972, the class was re-designated patrol escorts. The vessel remained a part of the unit until being paid off on 18 December 1998. The ship was sold for scrap and broken up at Port Hope, British Columbia in 1999.

References

Notes

Citations

References
 
 
 
 
 

 

Bay-class minesweepers
Ships built in Quebec
1957 ships
Cold War minesweepers of Canada
Minesweepers of the Royal Canadian Navy